The London Children's Ballet (LCB) is a registered charitable trust created in 1994. LCB was formed to give children the experience of performing as part of a company, in a professionally produced, full length ballet at a professional theatre. LCB provides opportunities to dance for children from many diverse backgrounds and the experience is free. 

Performances are staged annually at the Peacock Theatre, in the West End, London's primary theatre district. These performances include the staging of original productions, which have sold out every year since the company was established. The company is also involved in a number of smaller projects. The "£1 outreach matinees" enable the public to see a ballet at an affordable price and LCB2 is a touring company that visits venues where people are unable to attend the theatre, including hospitals, community centres, hospices and schools. These tours are produced throughout the year.

To become dancer in an LCB production, children must first attend an audition, designed to assess their suitability to take part. Successful candidates then meet for weekly rehearsals on Sundays leading up to the performance, so they may still attend school during the week.

LCB organises an annual summer school, lasting for one week and enrolling 100 children. The summer school curriculum includes a range of workshops, where children take classes in Ballet and other genres such as Jazz and Choreography. Older children also take part in a one-day tour, taking their summer school production to elderly homes around London.

LCB also provides a venue for recently graduated composers, choreographers, and designers from the Wimbledon College of Art.

History
Lucille Briance founded the LCB in 1994 after her daughter showed an interest in auditioning for dance schools. Lucille felt she was too young to join a proper dance school and thus looked for an alternative. She could not find a dance company for children that would allow her daughter to perform as well as continue her academic studies. Lucille therefore decided to create one and the LCB was born. A choreographer was appointed and the auditions for the new company were advertised, attracting children from many different parts of the community. After the first season, LCB hired a composer and began creating new works, aimed at the whole family. The first new ballet premiered by LCB was The Happy Prince. That production sold out.

Every year since, the LCB has staged narrative ballets based on classic children's stories.

Productions
2018 The Canterville Ghost, Revival Choreographer: Victoria Collison, Composer: Artem Vassiliev
2017 The Secret Garden (Shortened version, for Ballet in a Box), Choreography: Erico Montes, Composer: Artem Vassiliev
2016 Little Lord Fauntleroy Choreographer: Jenna Lee Composer: Richard Norriss
2015 Snow White Choreographer: Jenna Lee Composer: Richard Norriss
2014 Nanny McPhee Choreographer: Erico Montes Composer: Tim Hammond
2013 The Secret Garden Choreographer: Erico Montes Composer: Artem Vassiliev
2012 A Little Princess Choreographer: Samantha Raine Composer: Tim Hammond
2011 Rumpelstiltskin Choreographer: Morgann Runacre-Temple Composer: Piers Tattersall
2010 Ballet Shoes Choreographer: Matthew Hart Composer: Raymond Warren
2009 Snow White Choreographer: Olivia Pickford Composer: Richard Norriss
2008 Jane Eyre Choreographer: Nicole Tongue Composer: Julia Gomelskaya
2007 The Secret Garden Choreographer: Christine Sundt Composer: Artem Vassiliev
2006 The Scarlet Pimpernel Choreographer: David Fielding Composer: Ben Foskett
2005 The Canterville Ghost Choreographer: David Fielding Composer: Artem Vassiliev
2004 A Little Princess Choreographer: Vanessa Fenton Composer: Tim Hammond
2003 Prince and the Pauper Choreographer: Irek Mukhamedhov Composer: Tim Hammond
2002 Faithful Gelert Choreographer: Poppy Ben-David Composer: Tim Hammond
2001 Ballet Shoes Choreographer: Cathy Marston Composer: Raymond Warren
2000 The Last Battle Choreographer: Tom Sapsford Composer: Halyna Ovcharenko
1998 Mrs. 'Arris Goes to Paris Choreographer: Harold King Composer: Elizabeth Lane
1997 Jane Eyre Choreographer: Pollyanna Buckingham Composer: Julia Gomelskaya
1996 Faithful Gelert Choreographer: Julie Cronshaw Composer: Tim Hammond
1995 A Little Princess Choreographer: Harold King Composer: Tim Hammond
1994 The Happy Prince Choreographer: Valerie Egri Composer: Edward Elgar

Trustees 

Contains public sector information licensed under the Open Government Licence v3.0.

Finances 

Contains public sector information licensed under the Open Government Licence v3.0.

References

External links
 

 

Children's dance groups
Dance companies in the United Kingdom
Ballet companies in the United Kingdom
1994 establishments in England
Performing groups established in 1994
Charitable trusts